Ashley Du Preez (born 16 July 1997) is a South African professional soccer player who plays as a forward for South African Premier Division club Kaizer Chiefs.

References

1997 births
Living people
South African soccer players
People from Stellenbosch
Sportspeople from the Western Cape
Association football forwards
Stellenbosch F.C. players
South African Premier Division players